In statistics, there are many applications of "weighting":
 Weighted mean
 Weighted harmonic mean
 Weighted geometric mean
 Weighted least squares